Joseph W. Jacquot is the General Counsel to the Governor of the State of Florida. Previously Joe Jacquot was the chief Deputy Attorney General of the State of Florida from 2007–11.  He successfully argued before the United States Supreme Court in the landmark Miranda warning case Florida v. Powell and initiated the constitutional lawsuit against the Affordable Care Act ("Obamacare").

Prior to becoming General Counsel to the Governor, Joe Jacquot was a partner and business lawyer with Foley & Lardner LLP.  He represented clients in complex federal and state matters, handling litigation matters and counseling companies on regulatory issues and on any matter involving state Attorneys General.  He has filed several briefs in the U.S. Supreme Court on behalf of clients including for limited government in Spokeo v. Robins and for private property rights in U.S. Army Corps of Engineers v. Hawkes.

Jacquot also served as the Chairman of the Jacksonville Ethics Commission.

Early life and family
Joe Jacquot was born in Jacksonville, Florida.  He earned his bachelor's degree from the University of Virginia in Political and Social Thought and graduated from the University of Florida College of Law with Honors.  Jacquot worked for U.S. Senator Connie Mack prior to attending law school, and then returned to Capitol Hill as an attorney (see below).  Jacquot served as a lieutenant in the U.S. Naval Reserve.

He is married to Shannon Jacquot, and they have three children.

Legal career and public service
Following law school, Joe Jacquot served as counsel to Congressman Bill McCollum and helped enact the Justice for Victims of Terrorism Act.  Jacquot then served as counsel to U.S. Senator Kay Bailey Hutchison and was responsible for enacting of the Amber Alert Act.

From 2003-2004, he was the Chief Counsel for the U.S. Senate Judiciary's Subcommittee on Immigration and Border Security, working for Chairman Saxby Chambliss.  In that role, he drafted and helped enact the L Visa and H1B Visa Reform Act.  Jacquot also authored an opinion piece in the Wall Street Journal on immigration reform. and co-authored an opinion piece in the Washington Post on the Arizona immigration law.

From 2005-2006, he was the Deputy Chief Counsel for the U.S. Senate Judiciary Committee overseeing a variety of constitutional and legislative issues.  He helped manage the Supreme Court confirmation proceedings of Chief Justice John Roberts and of Justice Samuel Alito.

From 2008-2012, Jacquot was an adjunct professor at Florida State University's College of Law teaching "Congress and the Constitution."

Deputy Attorney General
In January 2007, Florida Attorney General Bill McCollum appointed Joe Jacquot to be the chief Deputy Attorney General.  Jacquot was the one of the "architects" and the lead strategic lawyer for Florida v. U.S. Department of Health and Human Services, the lawsuit where 26 states challenged the constitutionality of the federal health care act.

On December 7, 2009, Joe Jacquot argued before the U.S. Supreme Court in the case of Florida v. Powell  In a 7–2 decision in favor of the State of Florida, the Court held that the Miranda warning given to the defendant was adequate.

On the Jacksonville Ethics Commission, he pursued open government policies for new technologies used by city officials.  Previously, Jacquot chaired the Florida's Sunshine Technology Team to explore the further application of public records law to evolving technology in state agencies.

General Counsel to the Governor
In January 2019, Florida Governor Ron DeSantis appointed Joe Jacquot to be General Counsel.  He serves as chief legal advisor to the Governor and as the top lawyer for state agencies in the Administration overseeing litigation, rulemaking and other legal matters.  Additionally Jacquot serves as the Governor's advisor on judicial appointments.  In his first month, Governor DeSantis named three new Justices to the Florida Supreme Court.

References

Living people
Florida lawyers
Year of birth missing (living people)
People from Jacksonville, Florida
University of Virginia alumni
Fredric G. Levin College of Law alumni
United States Navy officers